Sherry Gunther is an American producer known for her work in animation. While at Klasky Csupo, Gunther worked on the television series Duckman, Rugrats and early seasons of The Simpsons, for which she won a Primetime Emmy Award in 1991. She was made senior vice president of production at Hanna-Barbera Cartoons in 1995. Under Hanna-Barbera President Fred Seibert she oversaw production of Turner Entertainment programs such as Dexter's Laboratory, Johnny Bravo, The Real Adventures of Jonny Quest and the World Premiere Toons. Sherry then went on to produce Family Guy and to found Twentieth Television's first in-house prime-time animation studio, and produced countless prime-time pilots for Imagine Television, Touchstone Television, Twentieth Television, Fox and Carsey Warner. She also produced theatrical shorts of Looney Tunes for Warner Bros. Sherry has received four additional Primetime Emmy nominations, Festival Awards, a Daytime Emmy Award, two CableACE Award nominations, and a Humanitas Prize.

Aside from her lucrative career as an animation producer and media executive, Sherry also became a serial Entrepreneur in 2007, founding companies in digital media content, social gaming, toys, and multi-platform brands. Sherry is currently Founder/CEO of POPmedia Brands, Inc., POPmediabrands.com a media company focusing on creating developing and producing media brands anchored in television series and animation, with digital and toy extensions. The company is in active development on The Beatrix Girls brand TheBeatrixGirls.com, which she created and launched in mass retail music and YouTube in 2013; as well as on several other exciting new projects.

Sherry is also an adjunct professor at the University of Southern California, at the Marshall School of Business, teaching graduate level classes through the Lloyd Greif Center for Entrepreneurship, focused on Entrepreneurship in the Media and Entertainment Industry. She is also a frequent speaker at industry conferences such as Digital kids, Digital Hollywood, Internet Marketing Association and many more.

Personal life
Gunther earned a Bachelor of Science degree from the University of California, Los Angeles (UCLA) and a Master of Business Administration degree from the University of Southern California. She speaks 4 languages fluently. She has two daughters, and lives in Calabasas, California with her husband Ken.

Filmography

References

External links 
 Masher Media official website
 

American television producers
American women television producers
Living people
University of California, Los Angeles alumni
Marshall School of Business alumni
American women chief executives
American technology chief executives
Hanna-Barbera people
Year of birth missing (living people)
21st-century American women